Topley is a village in northern British Columbia, Canada, located on the Yellowhead Highway (British Columbia Highway 16) between Houston and Burns Lake. It is named for the photographer William James Topley.

References

Designated places in British Columbia
Populated places in the Regional District of Bulkley-Nechako